Nadia Essayan (born 6 June 1957) is a French politician representing the Democratic Movement. She was elected to the French National Assembly on 18 June 2017, representing Cher's 2nd constituency.

She lost her seat in the first round of the 2022 French legislative election.

See also
 2017 French legislative election

References

1957 births
Living people
Deputies of the 15th National Assembly of the French Fifth Republic
Democratic Movement (France) politicians
People from Dimbokro
Women members of the National Assembly (France)
21st-century French women politicians
People from Cher (department)
Naturalized citizens of France